William Allen (August 13, 1827 – July 6, 1881) was a United States Representative from Ohio during the early part of the American Civil War, serving two terms from 1859 to 1863.

Early life and career
Allen was born near Hamilton, Ohio, where he attended the public schools. As a young man, he taught school, then studied law. Allen was admitted to the bar in 1849 and commenced practice in Greenville, Ohio, in 1850. He was the prosecuting attorney of Darke County from 1850 until 1854.

Congress
Allen was elected as a Democrat to the Thirty-sixth and Thirty-seventh Congresses (March 4, 1859 – March 3, 1863), where he served as chairman, Committee on Expenditures in the Department of the Interior (Thirty-seventh Congress).

Later career and death
He declined to be a candidate for renomination in 1862 and resumed the practice of law. He became affiliated with the Republican Party at the close of the Civil War and was appointed judge of the Court of Common Pleas of the second judicial district in 1865.

He declined the Republican nomination for election to the Forty-sixth Congress in 1878 because of failing health. He was  interested in banking until his death in Greenville, Ohio, in 1881. He was buried in Greenville Cemetery.

External links 

1827 births
1881 deaths
People of Ohio in the American Civil War
Politicians from Hamilton, Ohio
Democratic Party members of the United States House of Representatives from Ohio
People from Greenville, Ohio
County district attorneys in Ohio
Ohio Republicans
19th-century American politicians